The 1985 Bluebonnet Bowl was a college football postseason bowl game between the Texas Longhorns and Air Force Falcons, played on December 31 at Rice Stadium in

Background
The Falcons ran the wishbone offense and had the most regular season victories in program history with eleven, but a conference loss to  defending national champion BYU at Provo on November 16 cost them a shot at the national title and an outright Western Athletic Conference  This was the fourth consecutive bowl appearance for Air Force, the previous three were victories.  Unranked Texas tied for second in the Southwest Conference (SWC) but had lost to rival Texas A&M to end the regular season; it was their ninth straight bowl appearance and first Bluebonnet Bowl in five years.

This Bluebonnet Bowl was the first at Rice Stadium since 1967; the previous seventeen editions  were at the Astrodome. Nearly a dozen years earlier, Rice Stadium hosted Super Bowl VIII (January 1974).

Kickoff was at 1:45 pm CST.

Game summary
Texas – Harris 34 pass from Stafford (Ward kick), 11:14 remaining
Air Force – Pshsniak 1 run (Ruby kick), 3:37 remaining
Air Force – Weiss 1 run (Ruby kick), 1:38 remaining
Texas – Ward 24 FG, 6:19 remaining
Air Force – Evans 19 run (Ruby kick), 3:35 remaining
Texas – Ward 31 FG, 14:14 remaining
Texas – Ward 28 FG, 7:34 remaining
Air Force – Ruby 40 FG, :43 remaining

Air Force fullback Pat Evans had 18 carries for 129 yards in an MVP effort.

Statistics

Aftermath
The Falcons  finished in the top ten in both major polls (fifth in Coaches, eighth in AP), which remains their highest ranking ever. Texas  lost its fourth straight bowl and did not make a bowl game the following season  and head coach Fred Akers was soon fired.

References

Bluebonnnet Bowl
Bluebonnet Bowl
Air Force Falcons football bowl games
Texas Longhorns football bowl games
Bluebonnnet Bowl
Bluebonnnet Bowl
Bluebonnnet Bowl